Neal Carter is an American politician who has served as a member of the Arizona House of Representatives from the 15th legislative district since 2023. He previously represented the 8th legislative district from 2021 to 2023. He was appointed to the seat after incumbent Representative Frank Pratt died while in office. He is a member of the Republican Party.

Carter is a graduate of the University of California, Los Angeles and the New York University School of Law.

References

External links
 Official page at the Arizona State Legislature
 Biography at Ballotpedia

21st-century American politicians
Living people
Republican Party members of the Arizona House of Representatives
University of California, Los Angeles alumni
New York University School of Law alumni
Year of birth missing (living people)